Kaifeng Air Base is a People's Liberation Army Air Force Base, located about 1 mile southeast of Kaifeng (Henan Province) in the People’s Republic of China.

History
During World War II, the airport was known as Laifeng (Kaifeng) Airfield and was used by the United States Army Air Forces Fourteenth Air Force as part of the China Defensive Campaign (1942–1945).  Laifeng was the home of the Chinese-American Joint Intelligence Agency, and operated as a photo-reconnaissance base, with unarmed P-38 Lightning aircraft fitted with cameras flying over Japanese-held areas during the spring and summer of 1945.   The American units ended operations from the airfield after the war ended in September 1945.

References

 Maurer, Maurer. Air Force Combat Units Of World War II. Maxwell Air Force Base, Alabama: Office of Air Force History, 1983. 
 Airfields & Seaplane Anchorages China

Airfields of the United States Army Air Forces in China
Chinese Air Force bases